Clifford Clarke (born 2 May 1969)  is an Australian Paralympic wheelchair rugby player from  Australia.  He was born in Carlton, Victoria.  He won a silver medal at the 2000 Sydney Games with the Australian Steelers.

References

Paralympic wheelchair rugby players of Australia
Wheelchair rugby players at the 2000 Summer Paralympics
Paralympic silver medalists for Australia
Living people
Medalists at the 2000 Summer Paralympics
1969 births
Paralympic medalists in wheelchair rugby
Sportspeople from Melbourne
People from Carlton, Victoria